Filippo Gilli (born 19 October 2000) is an Italian football player. He plays for Casale.

Club career

Torino
He was raised in Torino youth teams and started playing for their Under-19 squad in the 2017–18 season.

He was called up to the senior squad for the first time on 1 August 2019 in a Europa League qualifier against Debrecen. He remained on the bench.

Loan to Alessandria
On 2 September 2019 he joined Serie C club Alessandria on loan.

He made his professional Serie C debut for Alessandria on 22 September 2019 in a game against Pianese. He substituted Alberto Dossena in the 77th minute.

Arezzo
On 22 September 2020, he moved to Arezzo.

Loan to Bisceglie
On 13 January 2021, he was loaned to Bisceglie.

International career
He played his first game for his country on 14 March 2017 in a Euro U17 qualifier against Belarus. He was not chosen for the final tournament squad.

References

External links
 

2000 births
People from Susa, Piedmont
Footballers from Piedmont
Living people
Italian footballers
Italy youth international footballers
Association football defenders
Torino F.C. players
U.S. Alessandria Calcio 1912 players
S.S. Arezzo players
A.S. Bisceglie Calcio 1913 players
Casale F.B.C. players
Serie C players
Serie D players
Sportspeople from the Metropolitan City of Turin